Phosphomethylpyrimidine synthase (thiC (gene)) is an enzyme with systematic name 5-amino-1-(5-phospho-D-ribosyl)imidazole formate-lyase (decarboxylating, 4-amino-2-methyl-5-phosphomethylpyrimidine-forming). This enzyme catalyses the following chemical reaction

 5-amino-1-(5-phospho-D-ribosyl)imidazole + S-adenosyl-L-methionine  4-amino-2-methyl-5-phosphomethylpyrimidine + 5′-deoxyadenosine + L-methionine + formate + CO

This enzyme binds a 4Fe-4S cluster.

The starting material is 5-aminoimidazole ribotide, which undergoes a rearrangement reaction via radical intermediates which incorporate the blue, green and red fragments shown into the product.

References

External links

External links 

EC 4.1.99